'Prolongation' may refer to:

Prolongation (music)
Cartan–Kuranishi prolongation theorem
Natural prolongation principle